Polygaloides chamaebuxus, synonym Polygala chamaebuxus, the shrubby milkwort, is an ornamental plant in the family Polygalaceae. Its flowers are solitary or in pairs in the leaf axils. The inner two sepals, the wings, are upright and white to yellow, sometimes pinkish or purple. The keel petals are bright yellow, aging to brownish-red or purple. It is native to the Alps and the mountains of west-central Europe. It was known to be grown in cultivation in about 1658 and was illustrated by Carolus Clusius. It has been given the Royal Horticultural Society's Award of Garden Merit.  

Several cultivars are also cultivated for garden use, including 'Grandiflora', whose flowers are purple-red and yellow.

They may be propagated from softwood cuttings taken in early in the growing season. Some varieties grow best in ericaceous conditions.

References

External links
Polygala chamaebuxus

Polygalaceae
Plants described in 1753
Taxa named by Carl Linnaeus